Robert Henry Pooley (September 19, 1878 – June 23, 1954) was a Canandian lawyer and political figure in British Columbia. He represented Esquimalt from 1912 to 1937 as a Conservative. Pooley was interim leader of the party from August 1924 to November 1926.

Biography 
He was born in Esquimalt, the son of Charles Edward Pooley, and was educated at Bradfield College in Berkshire, England. Pooley practised law in Victoria from 1896. In 1904, he married Laura Loewen. Pooley was Leader of the Opposition in the assembly from 1924 to 1928. He served in the provincial cabinet as Attorney-General from 1928 to 1933. Pooley died in Victoria at the age of 75.

References 

1878 births
1954 deaths
British Columbia Conservative Party MLAs
British Columbia Conservative Party leaders
Attorneys General of British Columbia
People from Esquimalt, British Columbia